is a railway station in Nishi-ku, Sapporo, Hokkaido, Japan, operated by the Hokkaido Railway Company (JR Hokkaido). The station number is S05.

Lines
Hassamu Station is served by the Hakodate Main Line.

Station layout
The station consists of two ground-level opposed side platforms serving two tracks, with the station situated above the tracks. The station has automated ticket machines, automated turnstiles which accept Kitaca, and a "Midori no Madoguchi" staffed ticket office.

Platforms

Adjacent stations

Surrounding area
 , (to Hakodate)
 Sasson Expressway

References

External links
 JR Hokkaido station map

Railway stations in Sapporo
Railway stations in Japan opened in 1986